Cymindis vagemaculata is a species of ground beetle in the subfamily Harpalinae. It was described by Breit in 1914.

References

vagemaculata
Beetles described in 1914